The 1981 NCAA Division I baseball tournament was played at the end of the 1981 NCAA Division I baseball season to determine the national champion of college baseball.  The tournament concluded with eight teams competing in the College World Series, a double-elimination tournament in its thirty fifth year.  Eight regional competitions were held to determine the participants in the final event.  Seven regions held a four team, double-elimination tournament while one region included six teams, resulting in 34 teams participating in the tournament at the conclusion of their regular season, and in some cases, after a conference tournament.  The thirty-fifth tournament's champion was Arizona State coached by Jim Brock.  The Most Outstanding Player was Stan Holmes of Arizona State.

Regionals
The opening rounds of the tournament were played across eight regional sites across the country, seven consisting of four teams and one of six teams. The winners of each Regional advanced to the College World Series.

Bold indicates winner.

Atlantic Regional at Clemson, SC

Central Regional at Austin, TX

East Regional at Columbia, SC

Mideast Regional at Ann Arbor, MI

Midwest Regional at Tulsa, OK

Northeast Regional at New Haven, CT

South Regional at Coral Gables, FL

West Regional at Tempe, AZ

College World Series

Participants

Results

Bracket

Game results

All-Tournament Team
The following players were members of the All-Tournament Team.

Notable players
 Arizona State: Alvin Davis, Donnie Hill, Lemmie Miller, Ricky Nelson, Kevin Romine
 Maine: Kevin Buckley, Joe Johnson, Bill Swift
 Miami (FL): Neal Heaton, Mike Pagliarulo
 Michigan: Steve Ontiveros, Jim Paciorek, Chris Sabo
 Mississippi State: 
 Oklahoma State: Gary Green, Mickey Tettleton, Jim Traber, Robbie Wine
 South Carolina: Don Gordon
 Texas: Mike Brumley, Spike Owen, Calvin Schiraldi

See also
1981 NCAA Division II baseball tournament
1981 NCAA Division III baseball tournament
1981 NAIA World Series

References

NCAA Division I Baseball Championship
1981 NCAA Division I baseball season
NCAA Division I Baseball
Baseball in Austin, Texas